The 2010 European Youth Baseball Championship was an international baseball competition held in Eindhoven and Veldhoven, Netherlands from July 20 to 24, 2010. It features teams from Austria, Belgium, Bulgaria, Czech Republic, Germany, Italy, Netherlands and Russia.

In the end the team from the Netherlands won the tournament.

Round 1

Pool A

Standings

Schedule

Pool B

Standings

Schedule

Round 2

Pool C

Standings

Schedule

Semi-finals

3rd place

Final

Final standings

External links
Official Website PSV Eindhoven
Official Website All In Veldhoven

References

European Youth Baseball Championship
European Youth Baseball Championship
2010
2010 in Dutch sport